Manurewa is a major suburb in South Auckland, New Zealand. It was part of Manukau City before the creation of the Auckland super city in 2010. The suburb is bisected by the Auckland Southern Motorway. Real estate values in Manurewa vary greatly.

Manurewa is Māori for "drifting kite".  The name refers to  a kite flying competition where a kite line was severed and drifted away.  The kite's owner was the chief Tamapahore who had a pā (fortified village) on Matuku-tururu (Wiri Mountain).  The name Manurewa commemorates the incident by the name.

Manurewa has a high proportion of non-European ethnicities, making it one of the most multi-cultural suburbs in New Zealand. Employment for many is at the many companies of nearby Wiri, Papakura, and at the steel mill at Glenbrook.

Southmall was one of the first shopping malls in New Zealand. It is located on the Great South Road. This shopping centre is no longer the main centre for many shoppers after the opening of Westfield Manukau City approximately 10 minutes away. 

Manurewa is the home of Auckland Botanic Gardens which receives over a million visitors a year.

Demographics

Manurewa had a population of 19,236 at the 2018 New Zealand census, an increase of 2,394 people (14.2%) since the 2013 census, and an increase of 3,645 people (23.4%) since the 2006 census. There were 4,572 households, comprising 9,765 males and 9,474 females, giving a sex ratio of 1.03 males per female, with 5,160 people (26.8%) aged under 15 years, 5,226 (27.2%) aged 15 to 29, 7,461 (38.8%) aged 30 to 64, and 1,392 (7.2%) aged 65 or older.

Ethnicities were 24.5% European/Pākehā, 30.9% Māori, 41.1% Pacific peoples, 23.0% Asian, and 2.3% other ethnicities. People may identify with more than one ethnicity.

The percentage of people born overseas was 34.9, compared with 27.1% nationally.

Although some people chose not to answer the census's question about religious affiliation, 27.3% had no religion, 46.3% were Christian, 3.8% had Māori religious beliefs, 6.7% were Hindu, 2.4% were Muslim, 1.4% were Buddhist and 6.4% had other religions.

Of those at least 15 years old, 1,494 (10.6%) people had a bachelor's or higher degree, and 3,153 (22.4%) people had no formal qualifications. 891 people (6.3%) earned over $70,000 compared to 17.2% nationally. The employment status of those at least 15 was that 6,927 (49.2%) people were employed full-time, 1,515 (10.8%) were part-time, and 996 (7.1%) were unemployed.

Sport and recreation

Rugby union
The Manurewa Rugby Football Club is based at Mountfort Park Manurewa. They were founded in 1921 and now play within the Counties Manukau Rugby Union Club competition and are one of the biggest and most successful Rugby clubs within the region. They have a large junior section plus and string Golden Oldies Section made up of many past players. They also have associated sports of AFL, Netball & Softball operating within the club. They were originally based at Jellicoe Park in Manurewa and had a club room affectionately known as the "Old Black Shed". They built the new clubrooms at Mountfort Park and moved to this site officially in 1978. Notable current Super 15 Chiefs players Tim Nanai-Williams, Viliami Taulani and Bundee Aki are former Manurewa Rugby Club players.

Association football
The football (soccer) club Manurewa AFC who play in the Lotto Sport Italia NRFL Division 1A are based in Manurewa.

Rugby league
The Manurewa Marlins are based in Manurewa.

Local government
Manurewa had a local government just like other suburbs of Auckland at that time. The local government was called Manurewa Borough Council, which started in 1937 and merged into Manukau City Council in 1965, eventually amalgamated into Auckland Council in November 2010.

Mayors during Manurewa Borough Council
1937–1944 William Johnston Ferguson
1944–1946 Fred Barnard
1946–1948 John Augusta Kelly
1948–1953 Reginald Frank Judson
1953–1956 Cecil Millington Crawford
1956–1965 Harry Beaumont

Education

Finlayson Park School, Leabank School. In 2020 Finlayson Park School in Auckland became the first school in New Zealand to set up a Kiribati language unit, where Erika Taeang was employed as the teacher.

Notable alumni includes libertarian politician Stephen Berry.

All these schools are coeducational. Rolls are as of

Notable people
Stephen Berry (born 1983), politician and political commentator
Jawsh 685 (born 2002), musician
Erika Taeang, teacher

References

External links

Photographs of Manurewa held in Auckland Libraries' heritage collections.

 Suburbs of Auckland